Glanate was a Gallo-Roman town on the right bank of the Var, which became the episcopal see of Glandève.

Ancient History
The site was first occupied by Ligurians, probably the Oxybii, in the 6th century BCE; they traded with Massallia (ancient Marseilles) and cultivated vines and olives (coll.)

By the 3rd century BCE, the Celto-Ligurian town had taken shape. Its name, in Gaulish, means "a habitation on the riverbank". In 125 BCE, the Romans under Octavian  annexed Provence and the undefended site of Glanate surrendered. In time, Glanate acquired the status of a Roman town. (coll., Le Monti)

In 406, the Burgundians pillaged the town.

Feudal and ecclesiastical history
Glanate, known by late Antiquity as Glandèves became a bishopric; the first known bishop was Fraternus in 451 (Le Monti), or Claudius, who ascended the episcopal throne in 541, but Glandèves was probably a see as early as 439.

Over the next two centuries, raids by the Burgundians, Francs and Lombards gradually destroyed the town, which was also sacked by the Saracens from 700 until they were driven from Provence by William of Arles in 973.

Despite this destruction, Glandèves continued to be a bishopric until the 17th century. However, the population moved to the nearby and much more defensible site of Entrevaux from the start of the 11th century.

Among its bishops were Symphorien Bullioud (1508–20), also ambassador from Francis I of France to Pope Julius II and chaplain to Francis I; Francis I Faure (1651–53), the pulpit orator, later Bishop of Amiens, and Jean-Baptiste de Belloy (1752–55), who died a centenarian in 1808, as Archbishop of Paris.

By the Concordat of 1801, the diocese of Digne was made to include the two departments of the Hautes and Basses Alpes, in addition to the former diocese of Digne, the Archdiocese of Embrun, the dioceses of Gap, Sisteron and Senez, a very considerable part of the diocese of Glandèves and the diocese of Riez, and fourteen parishes in the Archdiocese of Aix and the Diocese of Apt. In 1822 Gap was made an episcopal see and, thus divested of the department of the Hautes Alpes, the present diocese of Digne covers the territory formerly included in the dioceses of Digne, Senez, Glandèves, Riez, and Sisteron.

Bishops
Fraterne 451
Claude 541
Basile 549,554
Promotus 573
Agrèce 585–588
Guy (Hugo) 975 or 991–1012
Pons I. 1020 or 1029–1056 or 1057
Pons II. D'Aicard 1091, 1095
Peter I. 1095–1103?
Hubert 1108, 1146
Isnard I. 1149, 1165
Raimond 1179
Isnard Grimaldi 1190
Peter II. 1213–1225
P. (Peter or Pons) 1238–1245
Manuel 1246,1253
Bonifatius? 1289, 1290
Wilhelm 1294–1308
Anselm Féraud de Glandèves 1309 or 1316–1327 or 1328
Jacques de Moustiers 1328 or 1329–1340 or 1345
Hugues 1345
Bernard 1353–1365
Elzéar D'Albe 1365–1367
Bertrand Lagier (Latgier) 1368–1372 or 1378
Jean I. 1372 or 1375–1391 or 1402
Herminc de Viscarustède 1391 to c. 1404
Johann Bonifatius I. 1404 or 1405–1415 or 1426
Louis de Glandèves 1415–1420
Paul du Caire 1420–1424 or 1427–1446
Johann Bonifatius II. 1425 to c. 1445
Pierre Marini 1447–1465 or 1445–1457
Marin 1457 to c. 1467
Jean Inguimbert de Montigny 1468–1469
Mariano de Latvo 1470–1494 or 1469–1492
Christophe de Latvo 1493–1509
Symphorien Bullioud 1509–1520
Philippe du Terrail 1520–1532
Jacques du Terrail 1532–1535
Louis de Charny 1535–1539
Imbert Isserand 1539–1548
Martin Bachet 1550 to c. 1555 or 1564–1572
Aimar de Maurigon 1548–1564 or 1557–1564
Hugolin Martelli 1572 to c. 1592
Clément Isnard 1593–1604 or 1612
Octave Isnard 1605 or 1612–1625
René Leclerc 1627–1651
François Faure 1651–1652 or 1654
Jean-Dominique Ithier 1654–1672
Leon Bacoué 1672–1685
François Verjus 1685–1686
Charles de Villeneuve de Vence 1686–1702
César de Sabran 1702–1720
Dominique-Laurent-Balbe de Berton de Crillon 1721–1747
André-Dominique-Jean-Baptiste de Castellane 1748–1751
Jean-Baptiste de Belloy-Morangle 1751–1755 (also Bishop of Marseille)
Gaspard de Tressemanes de Brunet 1755–1771
Henri-Hachette Desportes 1771–1798

See also
 Catholic Church in France
 List of Catholic dioceses in France

References

Bibliography
Sources
  (Use with caution; obsolete)
  (in Latin) 
 (in Latin) 
 
 
 

Additional sources

External links
 Glandèves Cathedral
 Information plaque, Musée de la Poudrerie, Entrevaux 
 collectif, Plan et Historique d'Entrevaux. Entrevaux, Tourist Information leaflet.
 Le Monti (1990) Entrevaux, Cité Vauban. Nice, Imprimerie IM4.

Roman towns and cities in France
Geography of Alpes-de-Haute-Provence
Glandeves
Dioceses established in the 5th century
Former populated places in France
History of Provence-Alpes-Côte d'Azur